Wolfgang Müller (born 26 January 1943) is a German sprinter. He competed in the men's 400 metres at the 1968 Summer Olympics representing East Germany. Müller won bronze in the men's 400 metres at the 1972 European Athletics Indoor Championships, and was a three-time East German champion in the event. In 1972, he also set a world record in the 500 metres.

References

External links
 

1943 births
Living people
Athletes (track and field) at the 1968 Summer Olympics
German male sprinters
Olympic athletes of East Germany
Athletes from Dresden